The Canton of Jarnages is a former canton situated in the Creuse département and in the Limousin region of central France. It was disbanded following the French canton reorganisation which came into effect in March 2015. It consisted of 10 communes, which joined the new canton of Gouzon in 2015. It had 3,540 inhabitants (2012).

Geography 
An area of valleys and plateaux, consisting of woodland and farmland, with the town of Jarnages, in the arrondissement of Guéret, at its centre. The altitude varies from 333m (Domeyrot) to 625m (Saint-Silvain-sous-Toulx) with an average altitude of 427m.

The canton comprised 10 communes:

Blaudeix
La Celle-sous-Gouzon
Domeyrot
Gouzon
Jarnages
Parsac
Pierrefitte
Rimondeix
Saint-Silvain-sous-Toulx
Trois-Fonds

Population

See also 
 Arrondissements of the Creuse department
 Cantons of the Creuse department
 Communes of the Creuse department

References

Jarnages
2015 disestablishments in France
States and territories disestablished in 2015